One North East was the regional development agency for the North East England  region.

History

It was established in April 1999.
The North East received government aid for regeneration.

In June 2010, it was announced that One North East was to be abolished and this occurred on 31 March 2012.

Structure

It was based on the western side of the A1 Newcastle bypass, north of the Tyne, on the former site of the Stella power stations.

See also

 North England Inward Investment Agency

References

External links
 North East England
 Visit North East England

Regional development agencies
North East England
Department for Business, Innovation and Skills
Government agencies established in 1999
Newcastle upon Tyne
Organisations based in Tyne and Wear
1999 establishments in England